Judith Allison Pearson (née Lobbett; born 22 July 1960) is a British columnist and author.
   
Pearson has worked for British newspapers such as the Daily Mail, The Independent, the Evening Standard, The Daily Telegraph, and the Financial Times. She has also worked as a presenter for Channel 4 and BBC Radio 4. Pearson's chick lit novel was published in 2002; a film adaptation with the same title, I Don't Know How She Does It, was released in 2011.

Pearson campaigned in favour of Brexit and in 2016 described Brussels as the jihadist capital of Europe. She has criticised the Gender Recognition Act 2004, and opposed transgender rights.

Early life
Born in Carmarthen, Pearson moved to Burry Port, Carmarthenshire as a young child. She lived in Leicestershire, and attended Market Harborough Upper School (now Robert Smyth School). Her family moved to Washdyke Lane in Nettleham, and she attended Lincoln Christ's Hospital School, and won a prize for History in the sixth form; she gained A-levels in English, History and French. Her sister Kathryn, born in 1964, four years below at school, took A-levels in the same subjects.

She studied English at Clare College, Cambridge, graduating with a lower second class degree (2:2).

Career

Journalism
Pearson began her career with the Financial Times, where she was a sub-editor, before moving to The Independent and then The Independent on Sunday in 1992. There she was assistant to Blake Morrison before becoming a television critic, winning the award for Critic of the Year at the British Press Awards in 1993.

Pearson was a columnist with London's Evening Standard and The Daily Telegraph, then took over from Lynda Lee-Potter at the Daily Mail. Pearson ended her column for the Daily Mail in April 2010, when it was said that she was to join The Daily Telegraph. In September 2010, Pearson resumed her role as a columnist with The Daily Telegraph. As of 2015, Pearson was a columnist and chief interviewer of The Daily Telegraph. Pearson has presented Channel 4's  and BBC Radio 4's The Copysnatchers. She participated as a panellist on Late Review, the predecessor of Newsnight Review.

Pearson is on the Media/PR Advisory Council of Toby Young's Free Speech Union.

Books
Pearson's first novel, I Don't Know How She Does It (2002), is a "chick lit" examination of the pressures of modern motherhood. The book was a bestseller in the UK and the US, selling four million copies, and was made into a film.

Pearson was sued by Miramax for non-delivery of a second novel, I Think I Love You, for which she received a US$700,000 advance in 2003. Delivery was due in 2005: it was published in 2010. The novel was about a teenager's passion for David Cassidy in the 1970s and the man writing the so-called replies from David Cassidy to the teenage fans, who meet up 20 years later after marriage, divorce, and children. Her newspaper, The Telegraph, praised the novel for its warmth and sincerity; The Guardian described it as an "unrealistic and sappy romance".

A sequel to I Don't Know How She Does It was published in September 2017. The novel, How Hard Can It Be, continues the story of the protagonist Kate Reddy, now approaching 50 and struggling with bias against older women in the workplace. The book attracted considerable publicity but was not a bestseller.

Views

Islamic terrorism 
Shortly after the first of the 22 March 2016 Belgian bombings, Pearson suggested that the attacks were a justification for the Brexit cause in the then-upcoming referendum on Britain's membership of the European Union, writing on Twitter that "Brussels, de facto capital of the EU, is also the jihadist capital of Europe. And the Remainers dare to say we're safer in the EU!" Her tweet was criticised by Kay Burley and The Guardian columnist Owen Jones. Following the May 2017 Manchester Arena bombing, Pearson called for terror suspects in the United Kingdom to be interned.

Transgender issues 
Pearson views transgender identity as "a warped ideology". In 2017 she described a review of the Gender Recognition Act as "spineless politicians, pathetically eager to be on-trend" and that the review was due to "biological science lies".

Covid-19 pandemic 
Pearson said during the COVID-19 pandemic that she would not wear a protective face mask because she considered it demeaning. In September 2020, Pearson suggested purposely infecting young people with COVID-19 to create herd immunity within the population. In January 2021, Pearson drew censure from Twitter users after outing a critic's employer on Twitter, following her claim that National Health Service (NHS) bed occupancy during the pandemic was lower than suggested. 

According to The Guardian, Pearson has made misleading claims about COVID-19. In December 2020, she wrote in her Telegraph column that "Last week, Sir Patrick Vallance and Prof Chris Whitty presented another of their Graphs of Doom; this one cherry-picked several hospitals on course to run out of beds." However, this was false, and no such data was presented in the period stated. In July 2021, she misleadingly tweeted that hospitalisations were 0.5% of Covid-19 cases; Full Fact found that the calculation was incorrect, but also did not make sense due to the lag between testing positive and hospitalisation.

Personal life
Pearson was married to fellow journalist Simon Pearson, in May 1988 in Lincoln. She subsequently lived with Anthony Lane, film critic for The New Yorker.

Allison Pearson was declared bankrupt following a personal insolvency order made by the High Court of Justice in London on 9 November 2015. The bankruptcy petitioner was the Commissioners for HM Revenue and Customs.

Bibliography

 I Don't Know How She Does It (2002) 
 I Think I Love You (2010)  and 
 How Hard Can It Be? (2018)

References

Video clips
 S4C Without Walls clip from 1994

External links

1960 births
Living people
20th-century British journalists
21st-century British journalists
21st-century Welsh novelists
20th-century Welsh women writers
21st-century Welsh women writers
21st-century Welsh writers
Alumni of Clare College, Cambridge
British Book Award winners
British women journalists
Daily Mail journalists
The Daily Telegraph people
People from Cambridge
People from Carmarthen
People from West Lindsey District
Welsh columnists
Welsh women columnists
Welsh women novelists
20th-century Welsh writers
Welsh people of English descent
Financial Times people
The Independent people
British television critics
Women television critics
London Evening Standard people
British chick lit writers
MMR vaccine and autism